Nils Eklund (born 17 January 1927) is a Swedish actor. He has appeared in more than 50 films and television shows since 1952.

Selected filmography
 Bom the Flyer (1952)
 Äktenskapsbrottaren (1964)
 Rooftree (1967)
 Doctor Glas (1968)
 The Bookseller Gave Up Bathing (1969)
 Pistol (1973)
 Peter-No-Tail (1981)
 Göta kanal eller Vem drog ur proppen? (1981)
 The Journey to Melonia (1989)
 Freud's Leaving Home (1991)
Up (2009) as Charles F. Muntz (Swedish version)

References

External links

1927 births
Living people
20th-century Swedish male actors
21st-century Swedish male actors
Swedish male film actors
Swedish male television actors
Male actors from Stockholm